Tetratheca aphylla, also known as the Bungalbin Tetratheca, is a species of flowering plant in the quandong family that is endemic to Australia.

Subspecies
 Tetratheca aphylla subsp. aphylla
 Tetratheca aphylla subsp. megacarpa

Description
The species grows as an erect, spreading, leafless shrub to 60 cm in height. The flowers are pink or pink-purple, appearing from September to October.

Distribution and habitat
The range of the species lies within the Coolgardie and Mallee IBRA bioregions of south-west Western Australia, where it occurs in the Helena Aurora Range, 50 km north-north-east of Koolyanobbing, and 80 km east of Newdegate. The plants grow in pockets of skeletal soil among banded iron formations, rock outcrops and debris, in shrubland.

Conservation
The species is listed as Vulnerable under Australia's EPBC Act. The main potential threats are mining activities, inappropriate fire regimes and roadworks.

References

aphylla
Eudicots of Western Australia
Oxalidales of Australia
Taxa named by Ferdinand von Mueller
Plants described in 1882